Sosnovka is a rural locality (a selo) in Klintsovsky District, Bryansk Oblast, Russia. The population was 243 as of 2010. There are 7 streets.

Geography 
Sosnovka is located 16 km northeast of Klintsy (the district's administrative centre) by road. Rudnya-Terekhovka is the nearest rural locality.

References 

Rural localities in Klintsovsky District